Clayton West railway station is a station that was previously on the national rail network (until 1983) and now forms the eastern terminus of the Whistlestop Valley. It is situated in Clayton West, West Yorkshire, England.

History
The  line to Clayton West from Shepley Junction was authorised by an act of Parliament on 11 June 1866. It was opened on 1 September 1879 and was built to double line standards, as so many of the Lancashire & Yorkshire Railway branch lines in this area were.

It was closed on 24 January 1983.

References

Further reading

External links 
 Clayton West station on navigable 1947 O. S. map
 Kirklees light railway

Disused railway stations in Kirklees
Heritage railway stations in Kirklees
Former Lancashire and Yorkshire Railway stations
Railway stations in Great Britain opened in 1879
Railway stations in Great Britain closed in 1983
Railway stations in Great Britain opened in 1992
Denby Dale